A logophonetic writing system is one that uses chiefly logographic symbols, but includes symbols or elements representing sounds.

See also
List of writing systems

Notes

Linguistics
Encodings